Transnational Radicals: Italian Anarchists in Canada and the U.S., 1915–1940, is a book by historian Travis Tomchuk on early 20th century Italian anarchists in Canada and the United States.

Bibliography

External links 

 

2015 non-fiction books
English-language books
Books about anarchism
Anarchism in Canada
Anarchism in the United States
Books published by university presses of Canada
University of Manitoba